David Earl may refer to:

 David Earl (composer) (born 1951), South African composer and pianist
 David Earl (actor) (born 1974), British actor and comedian
 David Earl (priest) (born 1928), Dean of Ferns